James or Jim Galloway may refer to:

 James Galloway (physician) (1862–1922), physician and dermatologist
 James Galloway (footballer) (1893–1918), Scottish footballer
 James Galloway (film editor) (1928–1996), film editor
 James Galloway (rower) (born 1964), Australian rower
 James Gilvray Galloway (1828–1860), Scots-Australian trade unionist
 James M. Galloway, American doctor
 Jim Galloway (baseball) (1887–1950), American baseball player 
 Jim Galloway (soccer), Canadian soccer player
 , American biogeochemist
 Jim Galloway (1936–2014), Canadian jazz musician
 Jim Galloway (golfer), golfer from New Zealand in New Zealand Open

See also
James Galway, flautist